Scolopendra laeta, also known as the striped centipede, royal blue centipede or purple centipede for its varied patterning and colouration, is a species of centipede in the Scolopendridae family. It is endemic to Australia, and was first described in 1887 by German entomologist Erich Haase.

Distribution
The species has a wide range across mainland Australia.

Behaviour
The centipedes are solitary terrestrial predators that inhabit plant litter, soil and rotting wood.

References

 

 
laeta
Centipedes of Australia
Endemic fauna of Australia
Animals described in 1887
Taxa named by Erich Haase